Kiah Hall is a building in Savannah, Georgia, United States. Regarded as "one of the finest examples of Greek Revival architecture in Georgia", it is one of the original 1856 buildings of the country's only intact Antebellum Period railroad facility. Formerly named the Gray Building, of Savannah's Central of Georgia Railroad depot, it was designated a National Historic Landmark in 1976. It is now home of the Savannah College of Art and Design (SCAD) Museum of Art.

History
Originally conceived as a major trade post for Savannah, the railroad complex was occupied by Union troops at the close of the Civil War. In the early 20th century, the area surrounding much of the Central of Georgia Railroad buildings emerged as an important African-American commercial district and cultural hub, and remained so through the middle of the century. Despite its prime location and significant pedigree, however, the complex was beset by five decades of neglect and, by the late 20th century, the depot and its Savannah gray brick lay in ruins.

In 1992, SCAD acquired the deteriorating former railroad headquarters and began renovations. A year later, the building was dedicated to Virginia Jackson Kiah (1911–2001), a member of SCAD's Board of Trustees between 1987 and 1997 and a pioneering African-American female artist.

Virginia Jackson Kiah
Virginia Jackson Kiah was an African-American educator and artist. The daughter of civil rights activist Lillie Mae Carroll Jackson,

In 1940, Kiah and her husband of eight years, Calvin, moved to Savannah. Calvin was a professor at Georgia State University and Savannah State College during his career. In 1959, they opened their home at 505 West 36th Street in Savannah as the Kiah Museum, a teaching facility.

Kiah died in 2001, aged 90, having survived her husband by seven years. In 1993, she donated much of her art to the university, which held an exhibition of her work in 2009.

Gallery

See also
Buildings in Savannah Historic District

References

Commercial buildings completed in 1856
Buildings and structures in Savannah, Georgia
1856 establishments in Georgia (U.S. state)
Greek Revival architecture in Georgia (U.S. state)
National Historic Landmarks in Savannah, Georgia
Savannah College of Art and Design buildings and structures
Savannah Historic District